The Sleeping Lady may refer to:

 List of mountains named The Sleeping Lady
 The Sleeping Lady, a small clay figurine/statuette recovered from the prehistoric Ħal Saflieni Hypogeum, Malta
 The Sleeping Lady, a 1980 book by Canadian poet Joe Rosenblatt
 Sleeping Lady, a 1996 novel by American author Sue Henry

See also
 Dead woman (disambiguation)
 Sleeping Lady with Black Vase, by Hungarian painter Róbert Berény (1887–1953)